HD 93083 is an orange-hued star in the southern constellation of Antlia. It has the proper name Macondo, after the mythical village of the novel One Hundred Years of Solitude (Cien años de soledad). The name was selected by Colombia during the IAU's NameExoWorlds campaign. The star has an apparent visual magnitude of 8.30, which is too faint to be visible to the naked eye. It is located at a distance of 93 light years from the Sun based on parallax. HD 93083 is drifting further away with a radial velocity of +43.65 km/s, having come to within  some 484,000 years ago.

This is a K-type main-sequence star that has been assigned a stellar classification of K2IV-V or K3V, depending on the study. It is smaller and less massive than the Sun, with a higher metallicity, or abundance of  elements heavier than helium. The star is roughly six billion years old with a low projected rotational velocity of 2.2 km/s, and has an expected main sequence lifetime of 20.4 billion years. The star is radiating around 41% of the luminosity of the Sun from its photosphere at an effective temperature of 5,030 K.

Planetary system
In 2005, the discovery of an exoplanet orbiting the star was announced. This is another discovery using the radial velocity method with the HARPS spectrograph. The planet was given the name Melquíades by the IAU after a character in the book One Hundred Years of Solitude. The orbit of this body lies entirely within the habitable zone of the host star, and it is theoretically possible that a large moon orbiting the body, or a hypothetical terrestrial exoplanet at a trojan point, is habitable.

See also 
 List of extrasolar planets
 HARPS spectrograph

References



K-type main-sequence stars
K-type subgiants
Planetary systems with one confirmed planet

Antlia
Durchmusterung objects
1137
093083
052521